Charles Fredrick Sabel (born December 1, 1947) is an American academic and professor of Law    and Social Science at the Columbia Law School.  His research centers on public innovations, European Union governance, labor standards, economic development, and ultra-robust networks.

Sabel attended Harvard University and earned a B.A. in Social Studies in 1969 and a Ph.D. in Government in 1978. He was a faculty member in the departments of Political Science and Science, Technology, and Society at the Massachusetts Institute of Technology between 1977 and 1995. He joined the faculty at Columbia University in 1995. He is the recipient of a 1982 MacArthur Fellowship. Together with Joshua Cohen and others he developed the theory of directly deliberative polyarchy or democratic experimentalism, which is related to the concept of deliberative democracy. This concept mainly builds upon Japanese production methods interpreted as the institutionalization of decentralized learning.

His 1984 book, The Second Industrial Divide: Possibilities for Prosperity, co-written with Michael J. Piore, has been widely influential among labor scholars.

Sabel and others designed his mountain house via “a continuous mutual disruption,” which is a recurring theme in his scholarly work.  He describes such disruptions saying, “What you do determines what I do, and vice versa. By the end of our collaboration, neither of us could have anticipated the result.”

Charles Sabel received the honor of a Professorship through The Radboud Excellence Initiative at Radboud University Nijmegen in the Netherlands. Sabel will begin his time in the Radboud Excellence Initiative in June 2015.

Publications
 Fixing the Climate: Strategies for an Uncertain World, Princeton University Press, 2022. Coauthored with David G. Victor.

References

External links
 Official homepage

1947 births
Harvard University alumni
Columbia University faculty
Living people
MacArthur Fellows
Columbia Law School faculty